ODHA may refer to:

 Hockey Eastern Ontario (HEO), formerly the Ottawa District Hockey Association (ODHA)
 Oficina de Derechos Humanos del Arzobispado, ODHA  (Office of Human Rights of the Archbishopric). See Juan José Gerardi Conedera.
 O-Octadecylhydroxylamine, a chemical compound